The Pentagon (ru: Пентагон) home computer was a clone of the British-made Sinclair ZX Spectrum 128.
It was  manufactured by amateurs in the former Soviet Union, following freely distributable documentation. Its PCB was copied all over the ex-USSR in 1991-1996, which made it a widespread ZX Spectrum clone.
The name "Pentagon" derives from the shape of the original PCB (Pentagon 48), with a diagonal cut in one of the corners.

Many simple devices (upgrades) were invented to connect to the Pentagon with some soldering.

Versions
Pentagon 48K (1989 by Vladimir Drozdov)
Pentagon 128K (1991)
Pentagon 128K 2+ (1991 by ATM)
Pentagon 128K 3+ (1993 by Solon)
Pentagon 1024SL v1.x (2005 by Alex Zhabin)
Pentagon-1024SL v2.x (2006 by Alex Zhabin)
Pentagon ver.2.666 (2009 by Alex Zhabin)

The Pentagon 1024SL v2.3 included most of the upgrades of the standard Spectrum architecture, including 1024 KB RAM, Beta 128 Disk Interface and ZX-BUS slots (especially for IDE and General Sound cards). This model also featured a "turbo" mode (7 MHz instead of the original's 3.50 MHz).

Upgrades from the original ZX Spectrum
 Extra RAM ranging from 256 KB to 4 MB
 Several sound card possibilities such as Covox (usually named as SounDrive) or DMA UltraSound
 Additional video modes: 512x192 monochrome,  384x304, 256x192x15 (with no Attribute clash)
 CMOS with persistent real-time clock
 IDE Controller for hard drives
 "Turbo Mode" that clocks the CPU up to 7 MHz

References

External links 

Russian most popular Spectrum models 
Pentagon 1024 official site 
Schematic diagram of the Pentagon 48K and drive controller (DjVu)
128K Schematic diagram of the Pentagon (the DjVu)
Schematic and wiring diagrams Pentagon 128K 1991, revised and enlarged version (PNG)
Wiring diagram 128K the Pentagon (the PNG)
NEW English FaceBook Group

ZX Spectrum clones
Computer-related introductions in 1989
1989 establishments in the Soviet Union
Soviet computer systems